Sugar Coated is a Canadian documentary film, directed by Michèle Hozer and released in 2015. The film explores the impact on human health of the heavy use of sugar in the contemporary diet.

The film premiered at the Hot Docs Canadian International Documentary Festival in 2015, and was screened at the DOXA Documentary Film Festival before screening on TVOntario and at selected other documentary film festivals.

The film won the Donald Brittain Award for Best Social/Political Documentary Program at the 4th Canadian Screen Awards in 2016.

References

External links 
 

2015 films
Donald Brittain Award winning shows
Canadian documentary television films
2010s English-language films
2010s Canadian films